In machine learning, fine-tuning is an approach to transfer learning in which the weights of a pre-trained model are trained on new data. Fine-tuning can be done on a subset of the layers of a neural network or on the entire network. In the first case, the layers that are not being fine-tuned are "frozen" and not updated during backpropagation step. 

For some architectures, such as convolutional neural networks, it is common to keep the earlier layers frozen because they have been shown to capture lower-level features, unlike the later layers which often focus on high-level features that can be more related to the specific task that the model is trained on.

Fine-tuning is also common in natural language processing (NLP), especially in the domain of language modeling. Large language models like OpenAIs GPT-2 can be fine-tuned on downstream NLP tasks to produce better results than the pre-trained model can normally achieve. Models that are pre-trained on large and general corpora are usually fine-tuned by reusing the model's parameters as a starting point and adding a task-specific layer trained from scratch. Fully fine-tuning the model is common as well and often yields better results, but it is a more computationally expensive approach. Fully fine-tuning is also more prone to overfitting and may cause the model to perform worse out-of-distribution.

Fine-tuning is normally done using a supervised learning approach, but there are also techniques to fine-tune a model using weak supervision. Recently, reinforcement learning is also being used to fine-tune language models like ChatGPT (which is a fine-tuned version of GPT-3) and Sparrow through reinforcement learning from human feedback.

See also
 Transfer learning
 Large language models

References

Machine learning
Artificial intelligence